Poulton is an area of the town of Wallasey, in the Metropolitan Borough of Wirral, Merseyside, England. It is located on the Wirral Peninsula and bordered by Liscard to the north, Egremont to the north east and Seacombe to the east. The West Float (part of the former Wallasey Pool which gave the area its name), is to the south.

History
The name is Old English in origin and derives from pōl, meaning "pool" and tún, "a farm or settlement".

Originally a small fishing and farming hamlet, Poulton developed in the 19th century through the expansion of the docks and associated industries, becoming part of Poulton cum Seacombe before the two areas split. The settlement was part of the Wallasey parish of the Wirral Hundred, becoming a civil parish in 1866 and then part of the County Borough of Wallasey in 1912. The population of Poulton-cum-Seacombe was 178 in 1801, 3,044 in 1851, and 20,749 in 1901.

The area was served from 1895 by Liscard and Poulton railway station on the Seacombe branch of the Wirral Railway. The station consisted of a single island platform situated in a cutting. Passenger services ended on 4 January 1960 and all services on the line terminated on 16 June 1963.

Geography
The West Float is to the south of Poulton, separating it from Birkenhead.

Governance
Poulton is part of the Wallasey parliamentary constituency and represented since 1992 by Angela Eagle, a Labour Party MP.

At local government level, the area is predominantly within the Seacombe Ward of the Metropolitan Borough of Wirral. The most recent local elections took place on 5 May 2022.

Transport
Poulton Road is the main street that runs through this area, with Rostherne Avenue, Mill Lane and Gorsey Lane amongst others connecting to it.

Some of the former trackbed of the Wirral Railway branch to Seacombe was used as the approach road to the Kingsway (Wallasey) Tunnel, providing a connection from the M53 motorway to the west of Poulton.

References

Bibliography

External links

 History of Wallasey

Towns and villages in the Metropolitan Borough of Wirral
Wallasey